Laxå Municipality (Laxå kommun) is a municipality in Örebro County in central Sweden. Its seat is located in the town of Laxå.

In 1967 the market town (köping) of Laxå (instituted in 1946) was merged with two adjacent rural municipalities. One of them was transferred from the former Skaraborg County, placing today's municipality in two historical provinces, Närke and Västergötland.

Its history stretches back to the 12th century, when the convent Ramundeboda was founded about 4 km west of the town.

The Tiveden National Park is partly situated within the municipality.

Localities
Finnerödja
Laxå (seat)
Röfors

Elections
These are the results of the elections in the municipality since the first election after the municipal reform, being held in 1973. The exact results of Sweden Democrats were not listed at a municipal level by SCB from 1988 to 1998 due to the party's small size at the time. "Turnout" denotes the percentage of eligible people casting any ballots, whereas "Votes" denotes the number of valid votes only.

Riksdag

Blocs

This lists the relative strength of the socialist and centre-right blocs since 1973, but parties not elected to the Riksdag are inserted as "other", including the Sweden Democrats results from 1988 to 2006, but also the Christian Democrats pre-1991 and the Greens in 1982, 1985 and 1991. The sources are identical to the table above. The coalition or government mandate marked in bold formed the government after the election. New Democracy got elected in 1991 but are still listed as "other" due to the short lifespan of the party.

International relations
The municipality is twinned with:

  Grevesmühlen, Germany

References

External links

Laxå Municipality - Official site

Municipalities of Örebro County